Visa requirements for British citizens are administrative entry restrictions by the authorities of other states placed on citizens of the United Kingdom.  British citizens had visa-free or visa on arrival access to 188 countries and territories, ranking their passport 6th in terms of travel freedom (tied with France, Ireland and Portugal) according to the Henley Passport Index. Additionally, the World Tourism Organisation also published a report on 15 January 2016 ranking the passport 1st in the world (tied with Denmark, Finland, Germany, Italy, Luxembourg and Singapore) in terms of travel freedom, with the mobility index of 160 (out of 215 with no visa weighted by: 1, visa on arrival weighted by 0.7, eVisa weighted by 0.5 and traditional visa weighted by 0).

Visa requirements for other classes of British nationals such as British Nationals (Overseas), British Overseas Citizens, British Overseas Territories Citizens, British Protected Persons or British Subjects are different.

History
Visa requirements for British citizens were lifted by many European nations in the few years after World War II. The first changes occurred in 1947. These were removed by France on 1 January 1947.

This was then quickly followed by Belgium on 15 February 1947, Luxembourg 15 February 1947, Norway on 1 March 1947, Denmark on 22 March 1947, Sweden on 1 April 1947, Netherlands on 15 April 1947, Switzerland on 24 June 1947 Liechtenstein on 24 June 1947 and Iceland on 1 July 1947.

The requirement was lifted by Italy on 1 January 1948, Monaco (8 November 1948), Austria (15 May 1955), Paraguay (27 November 1966), United States (1 July 1988), Poland (1 July 1992), Bulgaria (March 1997), Romania (1 January 2001), Serbia and Montenegro (31 May 2003), Ukraine (1 May 2005), Georgia (1 June 2006), Moldova (1 January 2007), Kyrgyzstan (27 July 2012), Armenia (10 January 2013), Kazakhstan (15 July 2014), Indonesia (13 June 2015), Vietnam (1 July 2015) Belarus (12 February 2017), Cape Verde (1 January 2019), Uzbekistan (1 February 2019),  Turkey (2 March 2020) and Oman (December 2020).

*Afghanistan according to Taliban spokesperson in June 2022

Electronic visas for British citizens were introduced: India (15 August 2015), Djibouti (18 February 2018) and Malawi (October 2019).

Visas on arrival have been waived for British citizens by Mali (March 2015) and were for Malawi (1 October 2015 for four years, see above).

In April 2021 India announced that it would stop issuing Electronic visas for British citizens from August 2021, however this was reinstated on 05 December 2022.

In November 2021 Mongolia introduced eVisas for British citizens.

Visa requirements map

Common Travel Area 

The United Kingdom, together with its Crown Dependencies of Guernsey, Jersey and the Isle of Man and the Republic of Ireland make up a Common Travel Area where:

 No ID is required for travel by land for British or Irish citizens
 Only photographic ID is required for travel by air or sea for British or Irish citizens (but some airlines - such as Ryanair - may mandate passports for all)

However, there are occasionally checks on coaches and trains moving between Northern Ireland and the Republic of Ireland. British citizens living in Ireland have many of the same rights and entitlements as an Irish citizen. Citizens of third countries must have passports and, if required, visas to travel between the United Kingdom and Republic of Ireland.

British visas don't enable travel to Ireland for people without agreement with Ireland, and vice versa. Passengers travelling between the Common Travel Area and the Schengen Area are subject to systematic passport/identity checks.

Visa requirements
These tables document the visa requirements, and not travel restrictions related to the COVID-19 pandemic.

British Crown Dependencies and Overseas Territories

Territories and disputed areas

Non-ordinary passports
Holders of exclusive categories of British passports have this visa-free access, to: China (diplomatic passports), Kuwait (diplomatic or official passports), Mongolia (diplomatic or official passports), Qatar (diplomatic or official passports and British Diplomatic Messenger or Queen's Messenger Passports) and the United Arab Emirates (diplomatic or official passports). Holders of diplomatic or service passports of any country have visa-free access to Ethiopia, and Zimbabwe. Holders of British official and diplomatic passports require a visa for South Africa.

Non-visa restrictions

Temporary requirements related to the COVID-19 pandemic

Owing to the COVID-19 pandemic, several countries have temporarily suspended visa-free entry for British citizens:

Argentina - Visa required until further notice.
Australia - Visa required until further notice.
India - Britain was not on the list of 156 countries whose nationals had the Electronic Visa restored as of 1 April 2021.
Japan - Visa required until further notice.
Macao - Visa required until further notice.
New Zealand - Visa required in most cases until further notice. Limited visa-free travel possible for British citizens arriving from Australia or the Cook Islands. Visa-free transit allowed in some cases.
Taiwan - Visa required until further notice.

Most countries have also imposed additional non-visa requirements such as the need to show a COVID-19 vaccination record.

Travel consequences of Brexit

On 23 June 2016, a majority of the British electorate who voted, did so to leave the European Union in a nationwide referendum. In March 2017, the UK sent notification of their intention to leave the EU to the European Council through Article 50 of the Lisbon Treaty. British citizens ceased to be EU citizens upon the UK's departure from the EU thus forfeiting the rights of citizens. The UK withdrew from the EU on 31 January 2020, but British citizens retained the right of freedom of movement until the transitional period ended on 31 December 2020.

From 1 January 2021, when EU law ceased to apply to the United Kingdom, British citizens are afforded visa-free visits to the Schengen Area, for 90 days in any 180-day period. British citizens also enjoy visa-free entry to Bulgaria and Romania.

From sometime in 2022, most visa-exempt travellers seeking entry to the EU and EEA must apply and pay for travel authorisation through ETIAS. This was confirmed on 12 September 2018 and has no exception, yet agreed, for British citizens. This excludes British-Irish travel which is governed by laws that pre-date the European Community.

When in a non-EU country where there is no British embassy, British citizens no longer have the right to consular protection from the embassy of any other EU country present in that country.

Consular protection of British citizens abroad 

When in a country where there is no British embassy, British citizens may get help from the embassy of any other commonwealth country present in that country. There are also informal arrangements with some other countries, including New Zealand and Australia, to help British nationals in some countries.

See also List of diplomatic missions of the United Kingdom

Foreign travel statistics

See also

 British passport
 British National (Overseas) passport
 Passports in Europe
 British nationality law
 Visa requirements for British Nationals (Overseas)
 Visa requirements for British Overseas Citizens
 Visa requirements for British Overseas Territories Citizens
 Visa policy of the United Kingdom

References and notes
References

Notes

Britain
Foreign relations of the United Kingdom